The 1956 Boston University Terriers football team was an American football team that represented Boston University as an independent during the 1956 college football season. In its tenth and final season under head coach Aldo Donelli, the team compiled a 1–5–2 record and was outscored by a total of 166 to 96.

Schedule

References

Boston University
Boston University Terriers football seasons
Boston University Terriers football